Rahat Khan  is a Pakistani field hockey player and league official.

She was featured in an episode of the BBC Four program India’s Frontier Railways travelling with a girls' hockey team to a tournament in India. She was known as the "Hockey Queen" since 1985 for her prowess. In 1996, she received a trophy for "Best Sports Women" from the Pakistani Railways. She played and worked for the railway's hockey association for 12 years as a player and trainer. As of 2017, she is secretary of the Pakistani Punjabi Women's Hockey Association and manager of the under 19 Punjabi girls' team. Her son has no interest in hockey, showing only an interest in cricket.

Her sister, Sarwat Khan was also a Pakistani field hockey player

References

Pakistani women field hockey players
Pakistani field hockey coaches
Place of birth missing (living people)
Year of birth missing (living people)
Living people